Historia Plantarum (Latin: History of/Treatise on Plants) has been used as all or part of the name of several books, which include:

 Historia Plantarum (Theophrastus) (also called Enquiry into Plants), a book on plants by Theophrastus, written between c. 350 BC and c. 287 BC
 Historia Plantarum (Gessner) (also called Conradi Gesneri Historia Plantarum), a book on plants by Conrad Gessner, written between 1555 and 1565, published in 1750
 Historia Generalis Plantarum (Daléchamps), 1586
 Historia Plantarum Universalis Oxoniensis, unfinished work by Robert Morison, first volume published in 1680, second volume completed by Jacob Bobart the Younger and published in 1699
 Historia Plantarum (Ray), a book by John Ray, published in 1686
 Historia Plantarum Rariorum (A History of Rare Plants), a book by John Martyn, published in 1728–1737
 Historia Plantarum in Palatinatu Electorali, a book by Johan Adam Pollich, published in 1776–1777
 Nomenclator ex Historia Plantarum Indigenarum Helvetiae Excerptus Auctore by Albrecht von Haller, an index (nomenclator) to his book Historia Stirpium Indigenarum Helvetiae Inchoata, published in 1768